Law Hiu Chung (born 10 June 1995 in Hong Kong) is a Hong Kong professional football player who currently plays as a winger for Hong Kong Premier League club HK U23.

Club career
In 2012, Law signed for Hong Kong First Division club Rangers.

In 2014, Law left Rangers for Hong Kong Premier League club South China. On 13 April 2016, Law scored his first goal for South China against Maldives club Maziya, which South China wins the match 2–0.

On 11 June 2017, Pegasus chairperson Canny Leung revealed that Law along with three other South China players would be jumping ship to Pegasus.

References

External links
 
 Law Hiu Chung at HKFA

1995 births
Living people
Hong Kong footballers
Hong Kong First Division League players
Hong Kong Premier League players
Hong Kong Rangers FC players
HK U23 Football Team players
South China AA players
TSW Pegasus FC players
Association football wingers
Footballers at the 2018 Asian Games
Asian Games competitors for Hong Kong
Hong Kong League XI representative players